TASCAM is the professional audio division of TEAC Corporation, headquartered in Santa Fe Springs, California. TASCAM established the Home Recording phenomenon by creating the "Project Studio" and is credited as the inventor of the Portastudio, the first cassette-based multi-track home studio recorders.  TASCAM also introduced the  first low-cost mass-produced multitrack recorders with Simul-Sync designed for recording musicians, and manufactured reel-to-reel tape machines and audio mixers for home recordists from the early 1970s through the mid-1990s. Since the early 00's, TASCAM has been an early innovator in the field-recording and audio accompaniment to video with their DR-series recording platforms. TASCAM celebrated its 50th anniversary in 2021.

TASCAM recording units have been used for everything from Star Wars to Bruce Springsteen to Alan Parsons to Spoon and have won awards as diverse as "Hottest Tech" to "Hall of Fame" status. TASCAM tape Portastudios were cited by Reverb.com as one of the top used gear pieces to increase in value in 2020, with original units jumping 30-65% over their price two years prior.

History

TASCAM started out as a research and development group to research how to use TEAC's recording technology in musician and recording studio products.  The group was called TASC (TEAC Audio Systems Corp).  The founders included Mr. K. Tani, one of the founders of TEAC-Japan and Dr. Abe, a senior TEAC-Japan engineer.  In 1971 TASCAM (TASC AMerica Corp.) was founded to distribute TASC products in the U.S.  It also conducted additional market research in the US for the Japanese parent company. The company's first headquarters was at 5440 McConnell Avenue in Los Angeles.  In 1974 it moved its headquarters to 7733 Telegraph Road, Montebello, California.

In 1973, they introduced the first TASCAM-branded products:

 M-10 modular 12x4x2 mixer
 Series 70H-X MTR
 Series 70H-8 MTR

On March 4, 1973, TEAC merged the Tascam Corporation into TEAC Corporation of America (TCA). TEAC-Japan retains the exclusive worldwide rights to the TASCAM brand name for their professional audio related products.

In 2013, Gibson Brands Inc. bought a majority stake in TEAC Corporation, the parent company of TASCAM. In October 2017, TASCAM partnered with Philly punk band the Dead Milkmen and philanthropic record label The Giving Groove to sponsor a remix contest. TASCAM stakes were later returned by Gibson during their internal restructuring in 2018.

TASCAM released the new Model series in the Fall of 2018 with the Model 24 integrated 24-track production studio for mixing, recording, and use as a DAW controller. TASCAM followed up with the Model 16, a lower-priced 16-track mixing/recording studio in 2019, and released the Model 12, which introduced MIDI controller capabilities, hardware improvements, and stereo Bluetooth inputs and routing.

Notable and industry-recognized products

Portastudio and pocketstudio

 144 - 1979, World's first four-track recorder based on a standard cassette tape, 1982 Bruce Springsteen recorded Nebraska Album 2006 Mix magazine TECnology hall of fame

 Porta One Ministudio - 1984, A battery-operated portable studio.
 Porta Two Ministudio - 1987
 Porta 02
 Porta 02 mkii
 Porta 03 - 1991
 Porta 03 mkii
 Porta 05
 Porta 07 - 1993
 464 - 1992
 424
 424 mkii - 1996
 424 mkiii
 414 - 1997
 414 mkii
 488 - 1991, 8 track cassette recorder
 488 mkii - 1995, 8 track cassette recorder
 388 Studio - 1985 World's first eight-track 1/4" multitrack and mixer combination.
 564 - 1997 First MiniDisc-based digital Portastudio.
 788 - 2000 World's first 24-bit eight-track hard-disk Portastudio
 2488 24-Track Hard-Drive-based digital portastudio - 2004 Music Trades Magazine Product of the Year, MIPA Desktop Recording Workstation of the Year
 DP-02 eight-track digital recorder - 2008 Music & Sound Retailer Best New Multitrack recorder 
DP-3 eight-track digital recorder captures music to SD/SDHC cards.
DP-006 six-track digital battery-powered recorder captures music to SD/SDHC cards.
DP-008EX eight-track digital battery-powered recorder captures music to SD/SDHC cards.
DP-24SD 24-Track Digital Portastudio.
DP-32SD 32-track Digital Portastudio

Audio recorders

 TASCAM 80-8 Eight-channel 1/2" analog reel deck, TASCAM offered an external optional eight-channel dedicated DBX interface module. 1975.  2017 TECnology Hall of Fame Inductee
 DA-50 Pro DAT - 1989, First US-legal DAT tape recorder with SCMS Copy protection.
 MSR-24 24-track 1" Open Reel Tape Deck - 1990 TEC Award Nominee
 DA-800/24 DASH 1990, 24-channel digital tape Recorder.
 DA-88 DTRS (tm) Eight-channel Digital Audio Recorder - 1994 TEC Award Winner, 1995 Emmy Award Winner, 1995 NAB Professional's Choice Award winner.
 DA-30mkII DAT - 1995 TEC Award Winner
 DA-38 DTRS - 1997 TEC Award Winner
 DA-98 DTRS - 1997 PAR Excellence Award, 1998 NAB Professional's Choice Award, 1998 TEC Award Winner
 DA-302 DAT - 1997 World's first Dual DAT deck. 1997 PAR Excellence Award Winner.
 DA-98HR 24-bit DTRS   - 1998 Post Magazine Best Multitrack Digital Recorder.
 DA-45HR 24-bit DAT - World's first 24-bit DAT Recorder. 1998 PAR Excellence Award Winner, 1998 Keyboard Magazine Key Buy.
 DA-78HR 24-bit DTRS - 1999 Pro Audio Review PAR Excellence Award, 2000 TEC award Winner
 MMR-8 / MMR-16 eight-channel Hard Disk Recorder - 2000 Emmy Award Winner, 2001 Oscar Scientific Award Winner.
 MX-2424 24-channel 96 kHz Hard Disk Recorder - 1999 PAR Excellence Award Winner, 2001 TEC Award winner.
 DS-D98 Two-channel DSD Recorder based on DA-98HR - 2002 TEC Award Nominee.
 HD-P2 Portable Timecode enabled CF card two-channel recorder - 2006 PAR Award Winner.
 DV-RA1000HD DVD and Hard-Drive-based two-Channel Master DSD Recorder - 2007 TEC Award Winner.
 X-48 48-channel 96 kHz Hard Disk Recorder. - 2008 TEC Award Nominee
 DR-100 Two-channel Hand Held Recorder - 2009 TEC Award Nominee
 HS-P82 Eight-channel Dual CF Media Field Recorder - 2009 PAR Excellence Award,  2010 Good Design Award
 DR-03 Portable Handheld Recorder - 2010 Music & Sound Retailers Best Multitrack Award
 DR-680 eight-channel portable SD card recorder - 2011 TEC Award Nominee
 DR-40 Handheld four-track recorder - 2012 EM Magazine Editors Choice Awards
 DR-60D Four-track recorder for DSLR Cameras - 2013 NAB Best of Show Award
DR-10L Micro Linear PCM Recorder and lav mic
DR-10X Micro Linear PCM Recorder
DR-05X Stereo Handheld Digital Audio Recorder and USB Audio Interface
DR-07X Stereo Handheld Digital Audio Recorder and USB Audio Interface
DR-08 Stereo Handheld Digital Audio Recorder 
DR-40X Four Track Digital Audio Recorder and USB Audio Interface
DR-100MKIII Linear PCM Recorder

Mixers

 M-5 Analog Mixer - The Model 5 was released in 1975 in conjunction w/ the 80-8 eight channel 1/2 inch reel tape deck. It came as an 8x4x2 board, expandable to 12 channels w/ optional talkback module
 M-312 Analog Mixer - 12 channel mixing console
 M-520 Analog Mixer - 20 channel 8 bus mixing console
 M-700 Analog Mixer - 1989 dubbed "the Baby SSL"
 M-3700 Analog Mixer - 1992 TEC Award Nominee
 M-2600 Analog Mixer - 1995 TEC Award Nominee
 M-1600 Analog Mixer - 1997 TEC Award Nominee
 TM-D8000 Digital Audio Mixer - 1996 Blue Ribbon Best of AES Convention, 1998 TEC Award Nominee
 TM-D4000 Digital Audio Mixer - 2000 TEC Award Nominee
 X-9 Digital Four Channels DJ Mixer - 2000
 DM-24    Digital Audio Mixer - 2002 TEC Award winner 
 DM-4800 64 channel Digital Audio Mixer - 2007 TEC Award Nominee 2007 Good Design Award

Computer audio interfaces and controllers

 US-428 - 2001 TEC Award Nominee
 FW-1884 - FireWire Audio and Control Surface - 2003 PAR Excellence Award
 US-122 - 2004 Soundcheck magazine Best Audio/MIDI Hardware
 US-2400 - 24 Fader USB Controller - 2004 Mix Magazine NAMM Show Certified Hit
 US-322 / US-366    - 2013 Visual Grand Prix Gold Award.
 US-144MKII (Discontinued for Mac OS Catalina)
US-1x2HR 1Mic 2IN/2OUT High Resolution USB Audio Interface
US-2x2HR 2Mic 2IN/2OUT High Resolution USB Audio Interface
US-4x4HR 4Mic 4IN/4OUT High Resolution USB Audio Interface
Model 12 Integrated Production Suite Mixer/Recorder/DAW Controller
Model 16 Integrated Production Suite All-In-One Mixer/Recorder/DAW Controller
Model 24 Integrated Production Suite Multi-Track Live Recording Console Mixer/Recorder/DAW Controller

Software

 Gigastudio 3 Sampler - 2004 Mix Magazine Certified Hit, 2005 TEC Award Winner, 2006 EM Editors's choice Award, 2006 MIPA Award.

Trainers

 CD-GT1 CD Based Trainer with time stretch and pitch change.
 GB-10 - guitar and bass trainer with MP files and adjustable speed and loop features.

Signal processors

 TA-1VP  - Channel Strip with Antares AutoTune - 2011 TEC Award Nominee

References

External links

Official Website
Arne Berg NAMM Oral History Interview (2013)

Manufacturers of professional audio equipment
Music equipment manufacturers
Audio equipment manufacturers of  the United States
Manufacturing companies based in California
Technology companies based in Greater Los Angeles
Companies based in Los Angeles County, California
Montebello, California
Electronics companies established in 1971
Manufacturing companies established in 1971
1971 establishments in California
Audio mixing console manufacturers